Theodore Vernier (born 28 July 1731 at Lons-le-Saunier, Jura; died 3 February 1818 in Paris), Count of Montorient, son of Jean Baptiste Vernier, lawyer, and Claudine Leclerc, was a lawyer and French politician during the Revolution, the Directory and Consulate.

1731 births
People from Lons-le-Saunier
Presidents of the National Convention
1818 deaths